Ishaan Ghose is an Indian film director, editor, writer and cinematographer from West Bengal, India. He is the son of an Indian filmmaker Goutam Ghose who works primarily in Bengali cinema.

Early life 
Ishaan Ghose was born to an Indian filmmaker Goutam Ghose and costume designer Neelanjana Ghose.

Career 
He started working as a camera assistant in 2011 and continued till 2015, when he filmed documentaries till, he got his first chance to work independently with his father's Indo-Bangladesh co-production Shankhachil. In 2016, he and his sister Anandi began documenting the ragpickers in the Tiljala area for an NGO. They photographed them and spent a lot of time with them, but they had to stop because the NGO was having legal problems. It took him 12 years till he felt he had the confidence to step into direction independently. He frequently worked as an assistant or the cinematographer's assistant on documentaries, commercials, and feature films before plunging into the world of cinematic creativity and directed Jhilli.

Filmography

Awards

References

External links 
 

Living people
21st-century Indian film directors
Film directors from Kolkata
Bengali film directors
Bengali film cinematographers
Year of birth missing (living people)